Yablonovsky (masculine), Yablonovskaya (feminine), or Yablonovskoye (neuter) is the name of several inhabited localities in Russia.

Urban localities
Yablonovsky, Republic of Adygea, an urban-type settlement in Takhtamukaysky District of the Republic of Adygea

Rural localities
Yablonovsky, Rostov Oblast, a settlement in Krasnozorinskoye Rural Settlement of Bokovsky District of Rostov Oblast